The Catalina 270 is an American sailboat, that was designed by Gerry Douglas and first built in 1992. The design is out of production.

Production
The boat was built by Catalina Yachts in the United States and replaced the Catalina 27 in the company line.

Design

The Catalina 270 is a small recreational keelboat, built predominantly of fiberglass. It has a masthead sloop rig, an internally-mounted spade-type rudder and a fixed fin keel. It displaces  and carries  of ballast.

Variants
Catalina 270
Catalina 270 LE
Luxury Edition model.
Catalina 270 SD
The SD model has a PHRF racing average handicap of 198 with a high of 192 and low of 204.

Operational history
The boat is supported by an active class club, the Catalina 27-270 Association.

See also
List of sailing boat types

Similar sailboats
Aloha 27
Cal 27
Cal 2-27
Cal 3-27
C&C 27
Catalina 275 Sport
Crown 28
CS 27
Edel 820
Express 27
Fantasia 27
Halman Horizon
Hotfoot 27
Hullmaster 27
Hunter 27
Hunter 27-2
Hunter 27-3
Mirage 27 (Perry)
Mirage 27 (Schmidt)
Mirage 275
O'Day 272
Orion 27-2

References

External links

Keelboats
1990s sailboat type designs
Sailing yachts
Sailboat types built by Catalina Yachts
Sailboat type designs by Gerry Douglas